Mount Bazardüzü is a mountain peak in the Greater Caucasus range on the border between Dagestan, Russia and Azerbaijan. The southernmost point of Dagestan (and therefore Russia) is located about seven kilometers southwest of the peak. Translated from Azerbaijani, Bazarduzu means “market square”, more precisely as a specific landmark - “turn to the market, bazaar”. In the Middle Ages in the Shahnabad Valley, located east of this peak, annual large multinational fairs were held.

Climbing 
G. P. Baker and G. Yeld were the first men climbing the Mount in 1890 when the first ascent was recorded. Summer is considered the most appropriate period to climb the peak. There are two approaches to the Mount: one from the northeast and another from the southwest. In the northeast climbs can begin from the villages of Khynalyg (region of Guba) and Laza (region of Gusar). The southwest approach starts from the regional centre of Gabala - from two villages: one is Laza (the same name with the one in Gusar) and the other one is Gamarvan. The flood plain of the river Yatukhdere (Yatuxdərə)  is the starting point of the summit at 2800 m.

See also
 Mount Guton
 List of European Ultras
 List of elevation extremes by country

References

External links

 "Bazar Dyuzi, Azerbaijan/Russia" on Peakbagger

Bazarduzu
Bazarduzu
Bazarduzu
Bazarduzu
Bazarduzu
Bazarduzu
Bazarduzu